The Hotel Mims is a historic hotel in Mims, Florida. It is located at 3202 SR 46. On July 28, 1995, it was added to the U.S. National Register of Historic Places.

References

External links
Brevard County listings at National Register of Historic Places
Hotel Mims at Florida's Office of Cultural and Historical Programs

Buildings and structures in Brevard County, Florida
National Register of Historic Places in Brevard County, Florida